Matplotlib is a plotting library for the Python programming language and its numerical mathematics extension NumPy. It provides an object-oriented API for embedding plots into applications using general-purpose GUI toolkits like Tkinter, wxPython, Qt, or GTK. There is also a procedural "pylab" interface based on a state machine (like OpenGL), designed to closely resemble that of MATLAB, though its use is discouraged. SciPy makes use of Matplotlib.

Matplotlib was originally written by John D. Hunter. Since then it has had an active development community and is distributed under a BSD-style license. Michael Droettboom was nominated as matplotlib's lead developer shortly before John Hunter's death in August 2012 and was further joined by Thomas Caswell. Matplotlib is a NumFOCUS fiscally sponsored project.

Matplotlib 2.0.x supports Python versions 2.7 through 3.10. Python 3 support started with Matplotlib 1.2. Matplotlib 1.4 is the last version to support Python 2.6. Matplotlib has pledged not to support Python 2 past 2020 by signing the Python 3 Statement.

Comparison with MATLAB
Pyplot is a Matplotlib module that provides a MATLAB-like interface. Matplotlib is designed to be as usable as MATLAB, with the ability to use Python, and the advantage of being free and open-source.

Examples

Toolkits
Several toolkits are available which extend Matplotlib functionality. Some are separate downloads, others ship with the Matplotlib source code but have external dependencies.

Basemap: map plotting with various map projections, coastlines, and political boundaries
Cartopy: a mapping library featuring object-oriented map projection definitions, and arbitrary point, line, polygon and image transformation capabilities. (Matplotlib v1.2 and above)
Excel tools: utilities for exchanging data with Microsoft Excel
GTK tools: interface to the GTK library
Qt interface
Mplot3d: 3-D plots
Natgrid: interface to the natgrid library for gridding irregularly spaced data.
tikzplotlib: export to Pgfplots for smooth integration into LaTeX documents (formerly known as matplotlib2tikz)
 Seaborn: provides an API on top of Matplotlib that offers sane choices for plot style and color defaults, defines simple high-level functions for common statistical plot types, and integrates with the functionality provided by Pandas

Related projects
 Biggles
 Chaco
 DISLIN
 GNU Octave
 Gnuplot-py
 PLplot – Python bindings available
 PyCha – libcairo implementation
 PyPlotter – compatible with Jython
 SageMath – uses Matplotlib to draw plots
 SciPy (modules plt and gplt)
 wxPython (module wx.lib.plot.py)
 Plotly – for interactive, online Matplotlib and Python graphs
 Bokeh – Python interactive visualization library that targets modern web browsers for presentation

References

External links

 

Articles with example Python (programming language) code
Free plotting software
Free software programmed in Python
Python (programming language) scientific libraries
Science software that uses GTK
Science software that uses Qt